Comœdia was a French literary and artistic paper founded by Henri Desgrange on 1 October 1907 (Desgrange had already founded ). It published a number of texts by important literary figures, including Antonin Artaud's first publication on theatre, L'évolution de décor [The Evolution of Decor] (1924).:602 According to Richard Abel, it provides one of the most complete sources of cultural history in France just prior to World War I.

References

External links

1907 establishments in France
1944 disestablishments in France
Defunct newspapers published in France
Newspapers published in Paris